Nadarzyce may refer to the following places in Poland:
Nadarzyce, Września County (west-central Poland)
Nadarzyce, Złotów County (west-central Poland)